The Disney Channel, which launched in 1983, Disney XD, which began in 2009, Disney Junior, which launched in 2011, and shows on Disney+, along with the short-lived Toon Disney, have all occasionally featured lesbian, gay, bisexual, and transgender (LGBT) characters in their programming.

From 1983 onward, Disney struggled with LGBTQ representation in their animated series, and their content often included LGBT stereotypes, like queer-coded characters in the films Beauty and the Beast, Aladdin, and Mulan or the content was censored in series such as Blazing Dragons. Some reviewers have argued that when Disney and Cartoon Network are compared in terms of such representation, it is "easy to see who actually cares about LGBT representation." Some creators have also criticized Disney studio executives of cutting LGBTQ scenes from their shows in the past, or criticized that their shows were not seen as part of the "Disney brand".

In later years, there were efforts to ameliorate this, with series like The Owl House which featured a bisexual protagonist, Luz Noceda and various other LGBTQ characters. Other such characters were depicted in DuckTales and other series.

1980s and 1990s 

Gender has always been a component of animation, with scholars Harry Benshoff and Sean Griffin writing that animation has always "hint[ed] at the performative nature of gender." Some argued that the Walt Disney Company played with gender stereotypes in the past, featuring effeminate or sissy characters, or those coded as gay, which occurred while the characters were comedic and kept at arms length. Continuing from the late 1980s, villains in Disney films which were queer coded began to appear. 

Gaston and LeFou in the 1991 film Beauty and the Beast and  Jafar from the 1992 film Aladdin were created by an openly gay animator named Andreas Deja, and sang music by Howard Ashman, who was also openly gay. Deja supervised animation for those characters, with some noting the campy value of these characters. The fact that Deja had also worked on Scar in The Lion King and the titular character in Hercules, for example, has been discussed as an influence on the development of some Disney characters. In a June 1994 article in The Advocate, an executive producer of The Lion King, Thomas Schumacher, a gay man, argued that there were "a lot of gay people at every level" of Disney, and called it a "very supportive environment". He noted that he brought his partner, Matt White, to an annual company beach party and long company retreats and that while some executives were uncomfortable with Schumacher bringing his partner, higher executives didn't give him any trouble. Schumacher also said that while he regretted handing over reins of the film to Don Hahn, he was proud of songs by Tim Rice, a lyricist, and Elton John in the film. The Advocate noted that even if there aren't any openly gay or lesbian characters in the film, there is sensitivity to LGBTQ issues in the upper echelon of Disney.

This queer coding had its disadvantages, with networks not wanting to show overt representation. Rebecca Sugar argued that it is really heavy for a kid to only exist as a villain or a joke in an animated series. In 2011, Deja told news.com.au Disney would have a "family that has two dads or two mums" if they find the "right kind of story with that kind of concept." However, other critics criticized such queer-coded villains as contributing to homophobic discourse and equating queerness with evil itself.

Historian Peter C. Kunze argued that Ashman was recruited by Disney from Broadway, saying that while working with Alan Menken, he crafted songs in The Little Mermaid (1989), Beauty and the Beast and Aladdin. Kunze noted that Ashman and animators on The Little Mermaid were inspired by gay culture and gay icons. He also pointed out that Ashman was supported by Jeffrey Katzenberg after coming out as HIV-Positive, with the company even creating a production unit near his home so he could receive treatment in New York City rather than traveling to Burbank, California, before his death in 1991, with Beauty and the Beast dedicated to him. Kunze further noted that Albert Tavares, a gay man, oversaw casting on The Little Mermaid.

A show created by Terry Jones and Gavin Scott, Blazing Dragons, aired on Teletoon in Canada, Spacetoon in Arab countries, and Canal+ in France from 1996 to 1998. In the series, Sir Blaze is a member of the Square Table, and is flamboyant and effeminate. Throughout the series, he is implied to be gay. His implicit homosexuality was censored when the series aired on Toon Disney in the United States.

In June 1998, Mulan, an animated musical adventure film would begin showing in theaters. The film would include a bisexual captain Li Shang (voiced by BD Wong). Shang, in the film, loved Mulan when she was disguised as a male alter ego named Ping, and in her true form as a woman. However, Shang was not included in the 2020 live-action remake. One of the film's producers said that Shang was dropped in response to the MeToo movement, arguing that "having a commanding officer that is also the sexual love interest was very uncomfortable and we didn't think it was appropriate". This was met with social media backlash from fans of the original film and members of the LGBTQ community, with Reed initially surprised by criticism of Shang's removal, but acknowledged that the character had become an LGBTQ icon. He added that Shang's role would be served by two new characters, Commander Tung and Chen Honghui. Even so, some reviewers called the interactions between Honghui and Mulan to be more homoerotic than Li Shang's in the animated version and can be read as bisexual while others criticized the reasoning of Reed as incorrect. Mulan was described, by one scholar as having a character, Mulan herself, who could successfully pass as the opposite sex and as subverting her traditionally assigned gender signifiers, while having an unusually masculine body. It was further stated that as a result, Mulan was the "perfect embodiment of a drag king"  even though she maintains her heterosexuality as she is attracted to Li Sheng, comparing Mulan's interpretation of her sexuality to that of Bugs Bunny. Furthermore, gay playwright Harvey Fierstein voiced a character in Mulan, and only accepted the part after confirming that the rest of the cast was Asian so he would not take work away from an Asian actor.

2000s

From December 2004 to December 2006, W.I.T.C.H. aired on ABC Kids, ABC Family, and Toon Disney, along with France 3 in France. In April 2016, Greg Weisman, the producer of Season 2, said that Irma is a lesbian, only interested in "guys that are obviously out of reach," trying to be straight, but by doing this, she is "guaranteeing that she won't have to actually wind up with a guy" and when she comes close, she "comes close to landing one of them, she bolts." Even so, he left it open to interpretation, saying that this doesn't make it "impossible for her to be straight or bisexual or whatever." Weisman also said that Nerissa was Cassidy's lover, killing each other when they were in a romantic relationship with one another. Both began a relationship, in Weisman's words, after spending a lot of time together as teammates, and said that she "loved and mourned Cassidy." Even so, Weisman did not correct a fan when they described Nerissa as bisexual. Weisman also said that Cassidy and Nerissa were in a relationship when Nerissa killed her.

The episode from the original Proud Family series "Who You Calling a Sissy" was pulled from the network after its initial airing on August 12, 2005 as a result of regarding Michael’s sexual orientation while frequently being called a "sissy" at the time. The ban was lifted in 2020 as the episode is available to stream on Disney+. Ralph Farquhar revealed that in The Proud Family, which aired on the Disney Channel from 2001 to 2005, they had to use "code to talk about if Michael was gay, to talk about sexuality" and to be "sort of underhanded about it." He said this changed with The Proud Family: Louder and Prouder with the biggest changes to the show were "gender identity, obviously racial identity and quote-unquote wokeness,” and said that sexuality can be "sort of in your face with it a lot more," manifesting itself in the storytelling. Bruce W. Smith also said that the show has more than "just one gay person...representing the entire LGBTQ+ spectrum" and said that it is "not fair" to only have one LGBTQ character in the series. Barry and Randell kiss in the episode "Father Figures". It is the first Disney series to feature a same-sex kiss between a married couple.

2010s

In 2010, Phineas and Ferb featured gay singer Clay Aiken in his animated form in "Phineas and Ferb: Summer Belongs To You!".

A few conservative Christian commentators decried the promotional homosexuality in the 2013 film Frozen, owing to the results of Elsa's being different from others, her ostracism from society, and her independence and rejection of male suitors, are metaphors for lesbianism. Elsa's song "Let it Go" has been compared to the phenomenon of coming out of the closet.

On February 15, 2016, series finale of Gravity Falls, aired on the Disney Channel featured Sheriff Blubs and Deputy Durland confirmed as a gay couple.

In 2016, Byron Howard, director of Zootopia and Encanto, mentioned in the Fusion documentary Imagining Zootopia that he is openly gay and has been married since 1988. The film Zootopia features gay couple Bucky and Pronk Oryx-Antlerson. The couple later returned in the series Zootopia+ which was released on Disney+ in 2022.

In March 2017, Star vs. the Forces of Evil would make headlines with an episode entitled "Just Friends." The episode featured characters attending a concert and later concert-goers starting to kiss, "including several same-sex couples...in the background."

In August 2017, Doc McStuffins, featured a lesbian (and interracial) married couple, Thea and Edie, voiced by lesbian actresses Wanda Sykes and Portia de Rossi respectively. These two characters would be the first same-sex couple featured in a Disney Junior pre-school series. Some, like Jeremy Blacklow, GLAAD director of entertainment media, would argue that this episode would be a turning point for executives who fears boycotts from conservative groups like the Family Research Council and One Million Moms, calling the episode a "major win for both Disney and preschool series," showing that LGBTQ characters could appears in shows aimed at younger viewers without retaliation or crisis.

On September 30, 2018, Marvel Rising: Secret Warriors aired on the Disney Channel and Disney XD. The team included America Chavez, the first Latina, and lesbian, superhero in the Marvel Cinematic Universe, who had already appeared in animated shorts titled "Marvel Rising: Initiation". GLAAD expressed hope that the film would allow Chavez to be represented accurately, and "serve as an introduction of America and further queer characters to the Marvel Cinematic Universe." The film was later described as "a superhero tale with diversity oozing out of every animated frame," with note of Chavez having two mothers.

Star Wars Resistance, which aired from October 2018 to January 2020 on the Disney Channel and Disney XD, featured LGBTQ characters. In this animation, Orka and Flix run the Office of Acquisitions on the Colossus, with Orka doing the negotiations. Justin Ridge, an executive producer for the show, said that it's safe to call them a couple, adding "they’re absolutely a gay couple and we’re proud of that" on the Coffee With Kenobi podcast. Some said that they didn't see themselves in the show because they were only confirmed outside of the show's universe by the show's creators. Flix is voiced by gay actor Jim Rash.

In December 2018, the creator of Big City Greens, Chris Houghton, confirmed, on Tumblr, that Alexander and Terry are a couple, although protagonist Cricket Green does not seem to realize that they are gay throughout the series. Alexander is loud, rather effeminate and bossy, and Terry is silent and an introvert. They both appear to be hanging out each other in a few episodes such as "Gridlocked", "Fill Bill", "Barry Cuda", and "Trailer Trouble". Alexander is voiced by John Early, a gay actor.

In April 2019, it was shown that Jackie Lynn Thomas, a character in Star vs. the Forces of Evil, is bisexual. This was because she dated a male character but ended that relationship due to his feelings for the protagonist. Then, in the April 2019 episode "Britta's Tacos", it is revealed that Jackie has a relationship with a French girl named Chloé. As such, it is clear that Jackie is bisexual.

2020s

On March 6, 2020, Onward, a computer-animated urban fantasy adventure film, was released. In the film, Officer Specter briefly appears and in one scene she discusses her girlfriend's daughter pulling her hair out. She is voiced by Lena Waithe, a lesbian actress.

In April 2020, an episode of T.O.T.S., "Seas the Day," would feature a baby dolphin named Donny, adopted by a dolphin lesbian couple. Also in April 2020, DuckTales, premiered two characters, Indy and Ty, the guardians of Violet Sabrewing and the foster fathers of Lena Sabrewing, who were slated to be recurring characters.

On May 22, 2020, an animated short film titled Out premiered on Disney+. This short Pixar film revolves around Greg attempting to hide a framed photo of him and his boyfriend, Manuel, from his parents, out of fear for their disapproval. The seventh short film in the SparkShorts series, it is both Disney's and Pixar's first short to feature a gay main character and storyline, including an on-screen same-sex kiss.

On July 7, 2020, Dana Terrace, the creator of The Owl House, implied a romantic subtext between Amity and Luz, when responding to a fan who posted a screenshot from the upcoming episode "Enchanting Grom Fright" on Twitter, which showed one of the characters in the show, Amity Blight, putting her hands on the shoulders of Luz Noceda, the show's main protagonist, and looking into Luz's eyes. Claiming "there is no heterosexual explanation" for Amity's action, Terrace responded, "there really isn't". On August 8, 2020, the episode, written by Molly Ostertag, aired, openly presenting and confirming Disney's first animated LGBT+ female non-recurring character. In previous episodes, Luz had shown interest in male characters but had begun to grow closer to Amity. On the other hand, Amity is shown to have a crush on Luz, confirming her to be lesbian or bisexual. Terrace confirmed Luz as bisexual in a Reddit AMA in September 2020.

In the August 2020 "Enchanting Grom Fright" episode of The Owl House, Luz and Amity dance together, while casting spells, to defeat "Grom," a demon that manifests as their deepest fears. The animation supervisor for the show, Spencer Wan, hinted at this, referring to their intimate dance, which he storyboarded with Hayley Foster, as "the gay thing" and the first time he got to "do anything even remotely queer." The following day, he posted an animatic of Luz and Amity's dance scene. Amity and Luz represent Disney's first animated LGBT+ female regular characters. Terrace confirmed Amity as lesbian in a Reddit AMA in September 2020.

In the August 2020 episode of The Owl House, titled "Understanding Willow", one of the main characters (Willow Park) is shown to have two dads (Gilbert and Harvey Park).

In September 2020, Amber Vanich, a story revisionist for Rapunzel's Tangled Adventure revealed that Cassandra "Cass" was gay coded, with sapphic looks toward the story's protagonist, Rapunzel, and that some of these feelings are shown in the episode about memory loss. She also said that there were many "queer women who boarded scenes [of] Cassandra," and that women-love-women vibes were ingrained in every drawing she did of the character. These beliefs were also reflected by Klaudia Amenábar of The Mary Sue, calling Cass an "extremely gay-coded sword lesbian best friend" of Rapunzel. Earlier in the year, the series creator of Tangled, Chris Sonnenburg, said that he would be willing to produce a spinoff show focusing on Cass, "if the call came." The year before, in November, he called Cass a strong female character and talked about the "real friendship bond" between her and Rapunzel in September of the same year.

On September 29, 2020, Samantha "Sam" King, a writer for the Season 3 episode of DuckTales, "They Put a Moonlander On the Earth!", confirmed that Lieutenant Penumbra is a lesbian character. However, King wished it had been more overt and said that people should continue to ask for better representation.

In February 2021, Ralph Farquhar revealed that in The Proud Family, which aired on the Disney Channel from 2001 to 2005, they had to use "code to talk about if Michael was gay, to talk about sexuality" and to be "sort of underhanded about it." He said this changed with The Proud Family: Louder and Prouder with the biggest changes to the show ere "gender identity, obviously racial identity and quote-unquote wokeness,” and said that sexuality can be "sort of in your face with it a lot more," manifesting itself in the storytelling. 

In February 2021, Deadline reported that the film adaptation of Nimona was cancelled due to the shutdown of Blue Sky Studios. Webcomics commenter Gary Tyrrell criticized the decision, saying, "[Disney] could have allowed a very different kind of young heroine... I mourn for those who would have found a vision of themselves in an animated version". Sources told CBR that the film was "75% complete". Anonymous staffers at Blue Sky interviewed by Business Insider bemoaned the cancellation of the film, calling it "heartbreaking," arguing that the film "didn't look like anything else in the animated world," and saying that they believe it will never "be completed and released." A few staffers confirmed to BuzzFeed News that the film had an "I love you" scene between Blackheart and Goldenloin. In June 2021, Mey Rude, a writer for Out, said she still held out "hope that this film…will find its way back to life somehow." In July 2021, Meggie Gates in Bitch, said the film would have been Disney's first "legitimately queer film" and could have been a turning point "for how the corporation handles queerness" but that the Disney chose to "bury its gays" by cancelling the film, a blow to queer Disney fans. In April 2022, it was announced that Annapurna Pictures revived the film and will be releasing it on Netflix in 2023.

In March 2021, Kelly Marie Tran, the voice actress of Raya in the film Raya and the Last Dragon, argued that Raya is queer, stating that she believed there were "some romantic feelings" between Raya and Namaari in the story. She later made clear that this isn't the official Disney position and hoped for a Disney warrior that is "openly in the LGBTQ community" in the future, perhaps even a person who is disabled.

On March 17, 2021, two days after the broadcast of the series finale of DuckTales, storyboarder Sam King said that although she did not wish to "become "Word of Board Artist" on every headcannon and ship", she would permit fans to "assume I think every character except, like, Lunaris, is LGBTQIA+ in some shape or another."

In early June 2021, in celebration of Pride Month, Disney unveiled new merchandise and tweeted an illustration. In response, Alex Hirsch, the creator of A Disney series, Gravity Falls, criticized Disney studio executives for cutting LGBTQ scenes from their shows. In his tweet, which was retweeted thousands of times he urged people to "mercilessly" spam the executives by saying there is "room for everyone under the rainbow" if the executives claim LGBTQ+ characters are not "Disney appropriate."

In June 2021, Luca was released on Disney+. Some argued that the film felt "gay" even if not "explicitly queer," and more ambiguous, comparing it to the 2017 live-action film Call Me by Your Name and the 2020 animated film Wolfwalkers. Others said that Luca and Alberto hiding their true sea monster identities was an allegory for people who are members of the LGBTQ+ community, feeling as though they need to hide their true selves in order to be accepted. The film's director, Enrico Casarosa, said this was unintentional and that his original vision for the film was to explore the time in a child's life before romance, but he has since welcomed the interpretation after the film's release, also stating: "While I identify with pronouns he/him and I am a straight man, the themes of diversity, acceptance and inclusion in our movie are dear to my heart".

On July 10, 2021, The Owl House episode "Through the Looking Glass Ruins" premiered on the Disney Channel. One reviewer, Mey Rude said that the episode pushes forward the relationship between Luz and Amity, with Amity putting her job as a librarian in jeopardy to help Luz, while the latter goes through trials to get Amity her job back, and Amity kissing Luz on the cheek. Rude also noted that the LGBTQ characters in the show are "fleshed-out characters," pointed out the episode, directed by Bo Coburn, was co-written by Molly Ostertag and Terrace, with the former writing "Enchanting Grom Fright" and "Wing It Like Witches." That episode was co-written by Rachel Vine. Another reviewer described the episode as delivering a "definitive message that love transcends gender even in the world of children’s animation." The same reviewer also said that fans shouldn't look to "giant corporations for continual queer representation" and expressed their frustration at the end of The Owl House after its third season airs. Another reviewer noted that Luz and Amity were beginning to "understand their feelings for one another."

On July 24, 2021, The Owl House episode "Eda's Requiem" featured a character named Raine Whispers, who goes by they/them pronouns and is voiced by transgender and non-binary actor Avi Roque. Raine is Disney's first non-binary character. In the episode, Eda Clawthorne is shown to have feelings for Raine. The subsequent episode,  "Knock, Knock, Knockin' on Hooty's Door", which aired on July 31, reveals that Eda and Raine were formerly dating, before breaking up. The episode also has Luz and Amity asking each other out, officially becoming a couple. GLAAD praised the episode, saying they were excited to see a "wonderful and affirming message" from the series. The teen version of Raine Whispers is also voiced by a non-binary actor Blu del Barrio.

The series' Latin American dub in September 2021 was met with criticism by both viewers and Roque for portraying Raine as a cisgender male instead of non-binary. The character has also been portrayed as a cisgender male in other dubs. 

On October 3, 2021, one of the creators of The Ghost and Molly McGee, Bob Roth, said there is LGBTQ representation in the show, which starts small and later includes main characters, and urged fans to "let it unfold naturally." He also said that people were reading too much into the interactions between Libby and Molly McGee in one episode, assuming it is romantic. On October 5, 2021, the series introduced Ms. Roop, a history teacher at Brighton Middle School. In the episode "Mazel Tov, Libby!", she is shown slow-dancing with a woman. In the following episode "No Good Deed", she is confirmed to be a lesbian and the woman she dance with is Pam, her wife. Ms. Roop is voiced by lesbian actress Jane Lynch.

On October 5, 2021, in an AMA on Reddit, Dana Terrace, the creator of The Owl House, explained the show was cancelled not because of ratings or COVID-19 pandemic but rather because business people at Disney believed it did not fit "into the Disney brand." She stated that this was the case due to the serialized nature of the show and an audience which "skews older," rather than due to its LGBTQ+ representation, saying she wouldn't "assume bad faith" against those she works within Los Angeles. She also noted that due to the pandemic, budgets were constrained, episodes were cut, and noted that she wasn't allowed to present a case for a fourth season, and said she believed there was a future for the show if Disney Television had "different people in charge."

Amphibia introduced the same-sex couple, Ally and Jess, collectively known as The I.T. Gals. In the text of their video descriptions, the pair describe themselves as "just two girlfriends", qualified with an LGBT pride flag emoji. Lead character designer Andy Garner-Flexer later confirmed, in late October 2021, on his Twitter account that they are dating, saying that Ally's color palette was based on the pansexual pride flag, while Jess' was based on the bisexual pride flag.

On November 6, 2021, the Amphibia episode "Sprig's Birthday" was released, in which, during a brief scene, a marriage proposal is taking place between two men, with one of them, Tyler, having arranged with a stunt plane to spell the words "Will You Marry Me?" in the sky for his partner.

In February 2022, the short-form series Rise Up, Sing Out was released on Disney Junior and Disney+. The character Amelia has two moms. In that same month, The Proud Family: Louder and Prouder, (a revival of The Proud Family) was released on Disney+. The series includes Barry and Randall Leibowitz-Jenkins as the adoptive parents of Maya Leibowitz-Jenkins, an interracial gay couple. Michael Collins, a recurring character from The Proud Family, was confirmed to be gender non-conforming and gay. The executive producers of the series, Bruce W. Smith and Ralph Farquhar, said that the "show never really went away" and called it the "perfect time to bring back this show." ScreenRant argued that the revival broke down barriers through inclusion of multicultural families and characters belonging to the LGBTQ+ community. The season 2 episode "Perfect 10" shows how Barry and Randall got together. It is being nominated for a GLAAD award for Outstanding Kids & Family Programming.

On March 4, 2022, the Dino Ranch episode "Adoptasaurus Rex" featured a male same-sex dinosaur couple who wanted to have dinosaurs of their own. The episode is being nominated for a GLAAD Media Award for Outstanding Children's Programming.

On March 10, 2022, Pixar employees argued that "nearly every moment" of openly gay affection was cut due to demands from Disney executives, even if creative teams and Pixar executives objected, arguing that these employees are being barred from creating queer content in animated films. Some critics countered that Pixar also downplayed queer moments in films like Luca and Turning Red.

It was later reported in mid-March 2022 that a same-sex kiss in Lightyear, which was released on June 17, is being reinstated, with the film featuring the studio's "first-ever on-screen kiss between two characters of the same gender" between Alisha Hawthorne and her wife Kiko. At the same time, Lilith, Eda's older sister in  The Owl House, was confirmed to be aromantic asexual. Jade King of The Gamer noted that Cissy Jones said that her letter during a charity stream saying that Lilith didn't have any romantic attractions was "basically canon," further confirming those identities.

On April 16, 2022, Boscha was hinted to have two moms in The Owl House episode "Them's the Breaks, Kid" as two Hexside students bear a resemblance to Boscha. On April 25, 2022, Dana Terrace confirmed The Collector is non-binary and uses he/they pronouns.

On May 14, 2022, Sasha was confirmed to be bisexual and General Yunan and Lady Olivia become a same-sex couple in the Amphibia series finale. Five days after the series ended, Matt Braly confirmed Mayor Toadstool and Toadie became a same-sex couple as well. The series is being nominated for a GLAAD Award for Outstanding Kids & Family Programming - Animated.

On May 21, 2022, Luz and Amity kissed each other on the lips in The Owl House episode "Clouds on the Horizon". It is the first same-sex kiss between the main characters in a Disney animated series.

On June 29, 2022, the Baymax! episode "Mbita" featured the titular character starting a romantic relationship with another man named Yukio. He also appears in the sixth episode "Baymax". Mbita is voiced by gay comedian Jaboukie Young-White. The third episode "Sofia" features a transgender man recommending menstrual products to Baymax.

On September 21, 2022, Firebuds was released on Disney Junior and Disney+. The series features Violet’s moms Val and Viv and Axl’s dads Arnie and AJ. Val is voiced by queer actress Natalie Morales and Arnie is voiced by gay actor Stephen Guarino. The series is being nominated for a GLAAD award for Outstanding Children's Programming.

On October 15, 2022, The first The Owl House special "Thanks to Them" has Luz come out to her mother as bisexual. The special also reveals that Vee's campmate Masha is non-binary as they use they/them pronouns in their nameplate and their nails are painted in the colors of the non-binary pride flag. The series is being nominated for Outstanding Kids & Family Programming - Animated.

Strange World, which was released on November 23, 2022, features Ethan Clade, who is the first gay lead character in a Disney animated film. Ethan Clade is voiced by gay comedian Jaboukie Young-White.

On February 1, 2023, The Proud Family: Louder and Prouder episode "BeBe" confirmed Makeup Boy to be gay as he and Michael are shown to be dating. Makeup Boy is voiced by gay internet personality Bretman Rock.

On February 11, 2023, the Moon Girl and Devil Dinosaur episode "The Borough Bully" revealed Casey Calderon has two dads. Additionally, Brooklyn, a student at Lunella’s school is a transgender girl. Brooklyn is voiced by non-binary actor Indya Moore. The episode also features LOS-307 (voiced by Asia Kate Dillon), a supercomputer who refers to themself as a non-binary machine. The series also features Tai, a non-binary teenager, voiced by non-binary actor Ian Alexander.

Criticism and expanded representation
Disney executives did not always receive LGBTQ characters and relationships positively. They, for instance, axed a proposed lesbian relationship in Gravity Falls, at the same time that Gumball was censored for supposed "homosexual overtones" by various countries, and the National Expert Commission of Ukraine on the Protection of Public Morality in Ukraine advised the banning of SpongeBob SquarePants on the grounds that it promoted homosexuality. As such, Disney has been criticized for its approach to LGBTQ representation as compared to Cartoon Network. In June 2021, David Levine, a former Disney executive who oversaw kids programming for 16 years, said that "a lot of conservative opinion" driving depictions of characters of the Disney Channel, Cartoon Network, and Nickelodeon, with no hope for LGBTQ representation, saying he still has similar conversations to this day.

In March 2022, amid the controversy of Disney's involvement in Florida's Parental Rights in Education Act and lack of criticism from CEO Bob Chapek until after the bill had passed, three former Blue Sky staff members stated the Nimona film received pushback from Disney leadership, centered around the film's LGBT themes and a same-sex kiss. While staffers said that the kiss scene was taken out of presentations to Disney executives, they said still held out hope that it would be included in the final film.

In March 2022, leaked clips from a Walt Disney Company meeting showed the president of Disney General Entertainment, Karey Burke, explain to staff that she is a parent of "two queer children," and the production coordinator at Disney Television Animation, Allen Martsch, note that his team is trying to include "more trans and gender non-conforming characters" in Disney animations. Also, in the meeting, Layota Raveneau, series director of The Proud Family: Louder and Prouder and Rise Up, Sing Out, said that she was adding queerness wherever she could in the projects she worked on for Disney. Elsewhere, Burke promised that 50% of the characters in content created by the Disney General Entertainment would be "from minority groups."

In April 2022, Peter C. Kunze, a historian at Tulane University argued that there is a "long history of LGBTQ audiences and employees supporting, even saving, the company from veritable demise." He also said that Disney relied on LGBTQ people to "revamp its animated films", taking the example of Howard Ashman, an openly gay man who was the lyricist for The Little Mermaid and Beauty and the Beast. Kunze argued that Disney CEO Bob Chapek should remember the company's history and "understand the invaluable contributions LGBTQ communities have made to the company he leads."

See also
 Cross-dressing in film and television
 LGBT representation in adult animation
 LGBT representation in animated web series
 List of animated films with LGBT characters
 List of bisexual characters in animation
 List of cross-dressing characters in animated series
 List of fictional asexual characters
 List of fictional intersex characters
 List of fictional non-binary characters
 List of fictional pansexual characters
 List of fictional trans characters
 List of gay characters in animation
 List of lesbian characters in animation
 List of LGBT-related films by year
 Netflix and LGBT representation in animation

References

Further reading 

  
  
  
  
  
 
 
 
 
 
  
  
 
 
 

2000s animated television series
2010s animated television series
Animated television series
Disney animation
LGBT portrayals in mass media
LGBT-related animation
LGBT-related controversies